Taj-e Dowlatshah (also Romanized as Tāj-e Dowlatshāh, Tāj Dowlat Shāh, and Tāj-i-Daulat Shāh; also known as ‘Alī Dauleh Shāh, Dauleh Shāh, and Dowleh Shāh) is a village in Nahr-e Mian Rural District, Zalian District, Shazand County, Markazi Province, Iran. At the 2006 census, its population was 88, in 31 families.

References 

Populated places in Shazand County